is a railway station in Takehara, Hiroshima Prefecture, Japan.

Lines
West Japan Railway Company
Kure Line

Layout
It is an aboveground train station with two side platforms. IC cards and the like can be used, processed by a card reader.

It is a kan'i itaku station managed by the Mihara Regional Railway Department and an NPO corporation "Welfare Station Tadanoumi". Tickets were sold with a POS terminal until 2003, when a green window was set up at the outsourcing station, and tickets were sold with MARS.

References

Railway stations in Hiroshima Prefecture
Railway stations in Japan opened in 1932